Vincent Anselmo Gironda (November 9, 1917 – October 18, 1997) was an American professional bodybuilder, personal trainer, author, co-founder of the supplement company NSP Nutrition, and owner of the celebrity-frequented Vince's Gym. His nickname was the "Iron Guru".

Biography

Early life and career 
Gironda was born in The Bronx, New York. While he was still a young child, the family moved out west to Los Angeles when his father, a stuntman, was offered work in the upcoming Ben Hur film. Vince tried his hand at being a stuntman as well but when he saw a photograph of John Grimek, he realized he needed more physical development and began lifting weights at the age of 22.

The first gym he trained at was the local YMCA. He was there for approximately eight months before moving to the Easton Brothers' gym. The Easton brothers taught him to be one of their instructors. He worked there and experimented with training protocols before opening his own gym in North Hollywood, California in 1948 called Vince's Gym.

Training philosophy 

He had what many consider unorthodox training ideas. For example, unlike many other physique trainers, he did not prescribe regular barbell back squats (his gym had no squat racks), stating that they caused the over-development of the gluteal muscles and hips relative to the thighs. The exception would be female trainees who needed more gluteus and hip development. Typically, Gironda prescribed leg extensions, leg curls, sissy squats, hack squats and a special style of squat on a smith machine which he called the "thigh squat" for thigh development. In addition, he was one of the first few in the bodybuilding scene to comment that sit-ups do not contribute to the development of abdominal muscles.

Gironda also counseled against using the regular bench press for chest training, which he considered an inferior exercise because it involved too much front deltoid (shoulder); in its place he favored the "Neck press" in which the bar is lowered, with a wide grip and flared elbows, to the neck instead of the chest. He also favored chest pressing using dumbbells with the palms facing each other from flat & incline angles, stating that he thought to have the hands face the other with the thumbs facing each other also involved too much front deltoid. He considered his Gironda Dip the best overall pectoral developer. For Gironda, pectorals should be a wide slab, not two discrete masses. For the back, Gironda recommended using a full range of motion — such as touching the sternum to the bar when chinning — in order to fully contract the latissimus muscles. For shoulders, he stated that if you want to build maximum mass, shoulder raises (front raise, side lateral raise, and bent-over lateral raise) were the best. Although he normally recommended shoulder raises for deltoid development, he created a special form of shoulder press for Larry Scott to help develop his shoulders called the "Scott press". For triceps, he preferred the overhead cable extensions where the elbows rest on the cradle bench and triceps pressdowns while leaning against a post. For biceps, preacher curls (A.K.A. "Scott curls"), spider curls, and dumbbell curls were unbeatable. For training calves, he insisted that calf raises should be done barefoot & for high reps (usually sets of 20) with a full range of motion. His theory in bodybuilding was to build a body using isolation exercises, in order to achieve that mind-muscle connection.
He was also very famous for kicking people out of his gym for going against his techniques and performing the certain exercises he counseled against (i.e., sit-ups, bench press, squats, etc.), quoting, "We're not weightlifters, we're bodybuilders.”

During the 1960s, Vince's reputation grew as a personal trainer due to his pupils winning all the important contests, the most well-known pupil being Larry Scott, winning the first 2 IFBB Mr. Olympias in 1965 & 1966. Bodybuilders who have trained at Vince's Gym over the years include "Body by" Jake Steinfeld, Lou Ferrigno ("The Incredible Hulk"), Frank Zane, Don Howorth and  Arnold Schwarzenegger. Gironda came to be known as "the Iron Guru", a name former magazine editor and photo/journalist Denie Walter gave him.

In 1972 Vince and Ray Raridon (personal trainer at Vince's Gym) became frustrated with quality and prices of the nutritional supplements that were in the market. Vince and Ray went on to create their own formulations with Signet Labs in Los Angeles. They came out with NSP Nutrition as their answer to the low quality and ineffective supplements. NSP Research Nutrition was born, which Vince lovingly called "Old Time Body Building Co." They used those terms because "We still make the staples of natural bodybuilding that Vince so strongly advocated.

Diet

Gironda promoted a low-carbohydrate high-fat diet and invented a diet known as the "Steak and Eggs Diet". He ate butter, cream, eggs, milk and red meat in high quantities and only a small amount of carbohydrates. His dietary views are mentioned in his book Unleashing the Wild Physique, published inn 1984.

He recommended the use of numerous supplements, including desiccated liver tablets, free form amino acids, 225 mcg kelp tablets, Vitamin C tablets, digestive enzymes and raw glandular such as adrenal and orchic tablets. In certain circumstances, Gironda would recommend up to three dozen fertile hen-eggs a day, along with raw (unhomogenized, unpasteurized) cream or half-and-half milk. Large amounts of fertile eggs, he said, are equal to the anabolic steroid Dianabol in effectiveness. However, he was vehemently against the use of steroids for physique development, claiming that they contributed to a grotesque appearance.

Although Gironda was not a vegetarian, he endorsed a lacto-ovo vegetarian diet for his bodybuilding vegetarian readers.

Competitive history 
1949 Pro Mr California - 4th

1950 Pro Mr USA - tied for 4th

1951 Pro Mr America - 2nd

1957 Pro Mr USA - 3rd

1962 Nabba Pro Mr. Universe - Class 2, 2nd

Trainer to the stars 

By the early 1950s, he was a very well known trainer of both champion bodybuilders and movie and television actors. Gironda claimed to be able to get a person into shape faster than anyone else. He also claimed that the movie studios would send their actors and actresses to him for that reason.

A short list of stars who trained at Vince's Gym includes William Smith, Robert Blake, Cher, Clint Eastwood, Denzel Washington, James Garner, Brian Keith, Tommy Chong (of Cheech & Chong), Gordon Scott, Jeff Goldblum, Carl Weathers, Brad Davis, Michael Bowen, Clint Walker, Peter Lupus, Sean Penn and Erik Estrada.

Writer 
In the 1970s Vince wrote countless articles for Iron Man, managed his mail-order business, started a nutrition supplement company (NSP Nutrition) and authored his own training and nutrition manuals, all the time still operating his gym.

In the 1980s, a book was published with the collaboration of MuscleMag International publisher Robert Kennedy titled "Unleashing the Wild Physique". It contained considerable knowledge Vince gathered and tested throughout his 30+ year career. The release of the book prompted a promotion tour where the Iron Guru gave sold-out seminars throughout the US and Canada.

Downfall of Vince's Gym 
In the 1990s the growing popularity of very well-equipped gyms with considerable mass appeal and the emergence of numerous personal trainers to the stars made it difficult for simple gyms to operate, and so Vince's Gym closed in November 1995. A contributing factor to the gym closing was the severe health problems of Gironda's beloved son Guy. Caring for Guy sapped Gironda's energy, and his motivation to run his gym.

Death 
Gironda died on October 18, 1997, in Ventura County, less than a month before his 80th birthday.

Further reading 

Karl Coyne, Vince's Secret Locker Volume 3, 2021, Secret Locker Publications, ISBN   978-0-9985229-8-2
Robert Kennedy and Vince Gironda, Unleashing the Wild Physique, 1984, Sterling Pub. Co, 
Alan Palmieri, Vince Gironda Legend And Myth, CD-ROM, 2004
Daryl Conant, "InVINCEable, 2009
Randy Roach, "Muscle, Smoke and Mirrors" Vol,1 (2008) Vol,2 (2011)

References 

1917 births
1997 deaths
American bodybuilders
American male weightlifters
American people of Italian descent
Low-carbohydrate diet advocates
People associated with physical culture
People from the Bronx
Professional bodybuilders
Sportspeople from the Bronx
Strength training writers